The Hopkins Review  is a quarterly academic journal that publishes fiction, poetry, memoirs, essays on literature, drama, film, the visual arts, music, dance, and reviews of books in all these areas, as well as reviews of performances and exhibits. The original Hopkins Review was a literary quarterly published by the Johns Hopkins Writing Seminars from 1947 to 1953. It was brought back in 2008 in a joint venture between the Writing Seminars and the Johns Hopkins University Press. The current editor-in-chief is Dora Malech.

External links 
 
 The Hopkins Review  at Project MUSE

Arts journals
Publications established in 2008
English-language journals
Johns Hopkins University Press academic journals
Quarterly journals
Publications established in 1947
Publications disestablished in 1953
1947 establishments in Maryland